Andrés Baquero (1853 – 7 January 1916) was a Spanish teacher, researcher and writer from Murcia.

Works
Study the history of literature in Murcia from Alfonso X to the Catholic Monarchs, London: Printed by T. Fortanet, 1877. 
Illustrious sons of the province of Albacete. Foreword by HE. Mr. Marques de Molins. Madrid: Perez Dubrull, 1884. 
Catalogue of Fine Arts faculty Murcia. Murcia, Successors Nogués, 1913. 
Gleanings and documents on the history of Cartagena, Cehegín, Mula and Murcia. 
The bridge of Murcia, Murcia Journal of 22 February 1882.
The Virgin of the Fuensanta, patron of Murcia, Tip. Sánchez, 1927.

Spanish male writers
People from Murcia
Murcian writers
1853 births
1916 deaths